Ukrainization (also spelled Ukrainisation) is a policy or practice of increasing the usage and facilitating the development of the Ukrainian language and promoting other elements of Ukrainian culture in various spheres of public life such as education, publishing, government, and religion. The term is also used to describe a process by which non-Ukrainians or Russian-speaking Ukrainians   are assimilated  to Ukrainian culture and language

A major early case of Ukrainization relates to the Soviet indigenization policy korenizatsiya which aimed at strengthening Soviet power in the territory of Soviet Ukraine and in southern regions of the Russian SFSR. In various forms, Ukrainization policies also played out in several different periods of the 20th-century history of Ukraine, although with somewhat different goals and in different historical contexts.

After the Declaration of Independence of Ukraine in 1991, the government of Ukraine began following a policy of Ukrainization, to increase the use of Ukrainian while discouraging Russian, which has been gradually phased out from the country's education system, government, and national TV, radio programmes, and films. Until 2017, the law "On Education" granted Ukrainian families (parents and their children) a right to choose their native language for schools and studies. This law was revised to make the Ukrainian language the primary language of education in all schools, except for children of ethnic minorities, who are to be taught in their own language and later on bilingual.

In Western historiography, the term Ukrainization refers also to a policy and resulting process of forcing ethnic minorities living on Ukrainian territories to abandon their ethnic identity by means of the enforced assimilation of Ukrainian culture and identity. During the aftermath of World War II, in the Ukrainian SSR this process had been preceded by the expulsion of some ethnic minorities and appropriation of their cultural heritage. "Ukrainization" is also used in the context of these acts.

1917–1923: Times after the Russian Revolution

Following the Russian Revolution of 1917, the Russian Empire had dissolved, and the Ukrainians intensified their struggle for an independent Ukrainian state. In the chaos of World War I and revolutionary changes, a nascent Ukrainian state emerged but, initially, the state's very survival was not ensured. As the Central Rada, the governing body, was trying to assert the control over Ukraine amid the foreign powers and internal struggle, only a limited cultural development could take place. However, for the first time in the modern history, Ukraine had a government of its own and the Ukrainian language gained usage in state affairs.

As the Rada was eventually overthrown in a German-backed coup (April 29, 1918), the rule of a Hetmanate led by Pavlo Skoropadskyi was established. While the stability of the government was only relative and Skoropadsky himself, as a former officer of the tsarist army, spoke Russian rather than Ukrainian, the Hetmanate managed to start an impressive Ukrainian cultural and education program, printed millions of Ukrainian-language textbooks, and established many Ukrainian schools, two universities, and a Ukrainian Academy of Sciences. The latter established a Committee on Orthography and Terminology, which initiated a scholarly and methodological research program into Ukrainian terminology.

The Hetmanate's rule ended with the German evacuation and was replaced by the Directorate government of Symon Petlura. However, Ukraine descended into a new wave of chaos facing two invasions at the same time, from the East by the Bolshevik forces and from the West by the Polish troops, as well as being ravaged by armed bands that often were not backed by any political ideology.

1923–1931: Early years of Soviet Ukraine

As Bolshevik rule took hold in Ukraine, the early Soviet government had its own reasons to encourage the national movements of the former Russian Empire. While trying to ascertain and consolidate its power, the Bolshevik government was by far more concerned about political oppositions connected to the pre-revolutionary order than about the national movements inside the former empire. The reversal of the assimilationist policies of the Russian Empire was potentially done to help to improve the image of the Soviet government and boost its popularity among the common people.

Until the early-1930s, Ukrainian culture enjoyed a widespread revival due to Bolshevik policies known as the policy of Korenization ("indigenization"). In these years a Ukrainization program was implemented throughout the republic. In such conditions, the Ukrainian national idea initially continued to develop and even spread to a large territory with traditionally mixed population in the east and south that became part of the Ukrainian Soviet republic.

The All-Ukrainian Sovnarkom's decree "On implementation of the Ukrainization of the educational and cultural institutions" (July 27, 1923) is considered to be the onset of the Ukrainization program. The (August 1) decree that followed shortly "On implementation of the equal rights of the languages and facilitation of the Ukrainian language" mandated the implementation of Ukrainian language to all levels of state institutions. Initially, the program was met with resistance by some Ukrainian Communists, largely because non-Ukrainians prevailed numerically in the party at the time. The resistance was finally overcome in 1925 through changes in the party leadership under the pressure of Ukrainian representatives in the party. In April 1925 the party Central Committee adopted the resolution on Ukrainization proclaiming its aim as "solidifying the union of the peasantry with the working class" and boosting the overall support of the Soviet system among Ukrainians. A joint resolution aimed at "complete Ukrainization of the Soviet apparatus" as well as the party and trade unions was adopted on April 30, 1925. The Ukrainian Commissariat of Education (Narkomos) was charged with overseeing the implementation of the Ukrainization policies. The two figures, therefore, most identified with the policy are Oleksandr Shumskyi, the Commissar for Education between 1923 and 1927, and Mykola Skrypnyk, who replaced Shumskyi in 1927.

The Soviet-backed education system dramatically raised the literacy of the Ukrainophone rural population. By 1929 over 97% of high school students in the republic were obtaining their education in Ukrainian and illiteracy dropped from 47% (1926) to 8% in 1934.

Simultaneously, the newly literate ethnic Ukrainians migrated to the cities, which became rapidly largely Ukrainianized — in both population and education. Between 1923 and 1933 the Ukrainian proportion of the population of Kharkiv, at the time the capital of Soviet Ukraine, increased from 38% to 50%. Similar increases occurred in other cities, from 27.1% to 42.1% in Kyiv, from 16% to 48% in Dnipropetrovsk, from 16% to 48% in Odesa, and from 7% to 31% in Luhansk.

Similarly expansive was an increase in Ukrainian language publishing and the overall flourishing of Ukrainian cultural life. As of 1931 out of 88 theatres in Ukraine, 66 were Ukrainian, 12 were Jewish (Yiddish) and 9 were Russian. The number of Ukrainian newspapers, which almost did not exist in 1922, had reached 373 out of 426, while only 3 all-republican large newspapers remained Russian. Of 118 magazines, 89 were Ukrainian. Ukrainization of book-publishing reached 83%.

Ukrainization was thoroughly implemented through the government apparatus, Communist Party of Ukraine membership and, gradually, the party leadership as well, as the recruitment of indigenous cadre was implemented as part of the korenization policies. At the same time, the usage of Ukrainian was continuously encouraged in the workplace and in government affairs. While initially, the party and government apparatus was mostly Russian-speaking, by the end of the 1920s ethnic Ukrainians composed over one half of the membership in the Ukrainian communist party, the number strengthened by accession of Borotbists, a formerly indigenously Ukrainian "independentist" and non-Bolshevik communist party.

In the all-Ukrainian Ispolkom, central executive committee, as well as in the oblast level governments, the proportion of Ukrainians reached 50.3% by 1934 while in raion ispolkoms the number reached 68.8%. On the city and village levels, the representation of Ukrainians in the local government bodies reached 56.1% and 86.1%, respectively. As for other governmental agencies, the Ukrainization policies increased the Ukrainian representation as follows: officers of all-republican People's Commissariat (ministries) - 70-90%, oblast executive brunches - 50%, raion - 64%, Judiciary - 62%, Militsiya (law enforcement) - 58%.

The attempted Ukrainization of the armed forces, Red Army formations serving in Ukraine and abroad, was less successful although moderate progress was attained. The Schools of Red Commanders (Shkola Chervonyh Starshyn) was organized in Kharkiv to promote the careers of the Ukrainian national cadre in the army (see picture). The Ukrainian newspaper of the Ukrainian Military District "Chervona Armiya" was published until the mid-1930s. The efforts were made to introduce and expand Ukrainian terminology and communication in the Ukrainian Red Army units. The policies even reached the army units in which Ukrainians served in other Soviet regions. For instance the Soviet Pacific Fleet included a Ukrainian department overseen by Semyon Rudniev.

At the same time, despite the ongoing Soviet-wide anti-religious campaign, the Ukrainian national Orthodox Church was created, the Ukrainian Autocephalous Orthodox Church (See History of Christianity in Ukraine). The Bolshevik government initially saw the national churches as a tool in their goal to suppress the Russian Orthodox Church, always viewed with great suspicion by the regime for its being the cornerstone of the defunct Russian Empire and the initially strong opposition it took towards the regime change. Therefore, the government tolerated the new Ukrainian national church for some time and the UAOC gained a wide following among the Ukrainian peasantry.

Ukrainization even reached those regions of southern Russian SFSR, particularly the areas by the Don and Kuban rivers, where mixed population showed strong Ukrainian influences in the local dialect. Ukrainian language teachers, just graduated from expanded institutions of higher education in Soviet Ukraine, were dispatched to these regions to staff newly opened Ukrainian schools or to teach Ukrainian as a second language in Russian schools. A string of local Ukrainian-language publications was started and departments of Ukrainian studies were opened in colleges. Overall, these policies were implemented in thirty-five administrative districts in southern Russia.

Early 1930s: Reversal of Ukrainization policies
Starting from the early 1930s, the Ukrainization policies were abruptly and bloodily reversed. "Ukrainian bourgeois nationalism" was declared to be the primary problem in Ukraine. Many Ukrainian newspapers, publications, and schools were switched to Russian.  The vast majority of leading scholars and cultural leaders of Ukraine were purged, as were the "Ukrainianized" and "Ukrainianizing" portions of the Communist party. Major repression started in 1929–30, when a large group of Ukrainian intelligentsia was arrested and most were executed. In Ukrainian history, this group is often referred to as "Executed Renaissance" (Ukrainian: розстріляне відродження). The terror peaked in 1933 during the Holodomor, four to five years before the Soviet-wide "Great Purge", which, for Ukraine, was a second blow. The vast majority of leading scholars and cultural leaders of Ukraine were liquidated, as were the "Ukrainianized" and "Ukrainianizing" portions of the Communist party.

At the 12th Congress of the Communist Party of Ukraine, Moscow-appointed leader Pavel Postyshev declared that "1933 was the year of the defeat of Ukrainian nationalist counter-revolution." This "defeat" encompassed not just the physical extermination of a significant portion of the Ukrainian peasantry, but also the virtual elimination of the Ukrainian Autocephalous Orthodox Church clergy and the mass imprisonment or execution of Ukrainian intellectuals, writers and artists. Ukrainian music ensembles had their repertoires severely restricted and censored.  Foreign tours by Ukrainian artists were canceled without explanation.  Many artists were arrested and detained often for months at a time without cause. After not receiving any pay for many months, many choirs and artistic ensembles such as the Kiev and Poltava Bandurist Capellas ceased to exist. Blind traditional folk musicians known as kobzars were summoned from all of Ukraine to an ethnographic conference and disappeared (See Persecuted bandurists).

In the regions of southern Russian SFSR (North Caucasus and eastern part of Sloboda Ukraine included into RSFSR) Ukrainization was effectively outlawed in 1932. Specifically, the December 14, 1932 decree "On Grain Collection in Ukraine, North Caucasus and the Western Oblasts" by the VKP(b) Central Committee and USSR Sovnarkom stated that Ukrainization in certain areas was carried out formally, in a "non-Bolshevik" way, which provided the "bourgeois-nationalist elements" with a legal cover for organizing their anti-Soviet resistance. In order to stop this, the decree ordered in these areas, among other things, to switch to Russian all newspapers and magazines,  and all Soviet and cooperative paperwork. By the autumn of 1932 (beginning of a school year), all schools were ordered to switch to Russian. In addition the decree ordered a massive population swap: all "disloyal" population from a major Cossack settlement, stanitsa Poltavskaya  was banished to Northern Russia, with their property given to loyal kolkhozniks moved from poorer areas of Russia. This forced end to Ukrainization in southern RSFSR had led to a massive decline of reported Ukrainians in these regions in the 1937 Soviet Census compared to the 1926 First All-Union Census of the Soviet Union.

1930s to mid-1980
The Communist Party of Ukraine, under the guidance of state officials like Lazar Kaganovich, Stanislav Kosior, and Pavel Postyshev, boasted in early 1934 of the elimination of "counter-revolutionaries, nationalists, spies and class enemies". Whole academic organizations, such as the Bahaliy Institute of History and Culture, were shut down following the arrests.

In 1935–36, 83% of all school children in the Ukrainian SSR were taught in Ukrainian even though Ukrainians made up about 80% of the population. In 1936 from 1830 newspapers 1402 were in Ukrainian, as were 177 magazines, in 1936 69,104 thousand Ukrainian books were printed.

In the following fifty years the Soviet policies towards the Ukrainian language mostly varied between quiet discouragement and suppression to persecution and cultural purges, with the notable exception for the decade of Petro Shelest's Communist Party leadership in the Soviet Ukraine (1963–1972). The mid-1960s were characterized by moderate Ukrainization efforts in governmental affairs as well as the resurgence of the usage of Ukrainian in education, publishing and culture.

Eventually, all effects of Ukrainization were undone yet again and Ukraine gradually became russified to a significant degree. These policies softened somewhat only in the mid-to-late 1980s and were completely reversed again in newly independent Ukraine in the 1990s.

Post-1991: Independent Ukraine

On 28 October 1989, the Supreme Soviet of Ukraine changed the Constitution and adopted the "Law of Languages". The Ukrainian language was declared the only official language, while the other languages spoken in Ukraine were guaranteed constitutional protection. The government was obliged to create the conditions required for the development and use of Ukrainian language as well as languages of other ethnic groups, including Russian. Usage of other languages, along with Ukrainian, was allowed in local institutions located in places of residence of the majority of citizens of the corresponding ethnicities. Citizens were guaranteed the right to use their native or any other languages and were entitled to address various institutions and organisations in Ukrainian, in Russian, or in another language of their work, or in a language acceptable to the parties. After the Ukrainian accession of independence following the dissolution of the Soviet Union the law, with some minor amendments, remained in force in the independent Ukrainian state.

Adopted in 1996, the new Constitution of Ukraine confirmed the official state status of the Ukrainian language, and guaranteed the free development, use, and protection of Russian and other languages of national minorities of Ukraine.

Language issues are still used by politicians to generate controversy. On May 20, 2008, Donetsk city council passed a resolution limiting the expansion of Ukrainian-language education in the city.  The following day the city prosecutor declared the decision illegal and the mayor suspended it, and the council reversed itself two days later.

According to a March 2010 survey, forced Ukrainization and Russian language suppression are among the least troubling problems for Ukrainian citizens, concerning only 4.8% of population.

Educational system

The government of independent Ukraine implemented policies to broaden the use of Ukrainian and mandated a progressively increased role for Ukrainian in the media and commerce. The most significant was the government's concerted effort to implement Ukrainian, as the only official state language in the country, into the state educational system. Despite the Constitution, the Law on Education (grants Ukrainian families (parents and their children) a right to choose their native language for schools and studies) as well as the Law of Languages (a guarantee for the protection of all languages in Ukraine) the education system gradually reshaped from a system that was only partly Ukrainian to the one that is overwhelmingly so. The Russian language is still studied as a required course in all secondary schools, including those with Ukrainian as the primary language of instructions. The number of secondary school students who received their primary education in Ukrainian grew from 47.9% in 1990–1991 (the last school year before Ukrainian independence) to 67.4% in 1999 and to 75.1% by 2003–2004 (see table). Ukrainization has achieved even greater gains in higher education institutions where as of 1990–1991 only 7% of students were being taught primarily in Ukrainian. By 2003–2004 the percentage of college and technicum students studying in Ukrainian reached 87.7% and for the students of the University-level institutions this number reached 80.1% (see table).

The extent of educational institutions' Ukrainization varies in the different regions of Ukraine. In the 16 western oblasts (provinces) of Ukraine there are 26 Russian language schools out of 12,907 and in Kyiv six out of 452 schools use Russian as their primary language of instruction, (according to a 2006 survey, Ukrainian is used at home by 23% of Kyivans, as 52% use Russian and 24% switch between both). In the Donets Basin region the percentage of students receiving education in Russian roughly corresponds to the percentage of population who considers Russian as their native language and in Crimea the overwhelming majority of secondary schools students are taught in Russian. The distribution is similar in the institutes of the higher education while the latter are somewhat more Ukrainianized.

The increase of the share of secondary school students obtaining education in Ukrainian (from 47.9% to 67%) over the first decade of the Ukrainian independence roughly corresponded to the share of native Ukrainian speakers - 67.5%. Schools continue to be transferred to the Ukrainian language up to this day. At the end of the 1990s, about 50% of professional school students, 62% of college students and 67% of university students (cf. 7% in 1991) studied in Ukrainian and in the following five years the number increased even further (see table).

In some cases, the changing of the language of instruction in institutions, led to the charges of assimilation, raised mostly by the Russian-speaking population.  Despite this, the transition was gradual and lacked many controversies that surrounded the de-Russification in several of the other former Soviet Republics, its perception within Ukraine remained mixed.

2017 law "On Education"
 
On September 25, 2017, a new law on education was signed by the President (draft approved by Rada on September 5, 2017) which said that the Ukrainian language is the language of education at all levels except for subjects that are allowed to be taught in two or more languages, namely English or one of the other official languages of the European Union. The law stipulates a 3-year transitional period to come in full effect. In February 2018, this period was extended until 2023.

The law was condemned by PACE that called it "a major impediment to the teaching of national minorities". The law also faced criticism from officials in Hungary, Romania and Russia. (Hungarian and Romanian are official languages of the European Union, Russian is not.) Ukrainian officials stressed that the new law complies fully with European norms on minority rights. The law does state that "Persons belonging to indigenous peoples of Ukraine are guaranteed the right to study in public facilities of preschool and primary education in the language of instruction of the respective indigenous people, along with the state language of instruction" in separate classes or groups. PACE describes this as a significant curtailing of the rights of indigenous peoples carried out without consultations with their representatives. On 27 June 2018 Ukrainian foreign minister Pavlo Klimkin stated that following the recommendation of the Venice Commission the language provision of the (September 2017) law on education will not apply to private schools and that every public school for national minorities "will have broad powers to independently determine which classes will be taught in Ukrainian or their native language."

Mass media

Since 2004 the Ukrainian government has enacted restrictions on Russian-language television and radio programmes. Russian-language programmes are required to include a Ukrainian translation or subtitles, and local radio and television stations have the right to broadcast in Russian only if they can prove they have a Russian audience. There was some opposition against this ban. Today the ban is in full effect, but Russian movies are mostly subtitled in cinemas and on Ukrainian television. Non-Russian and non-Ukrainian movies which used to be dubbed in Russian may now only be dubbed, post-synchronized or subtitled in Ukrainian. Ukrainian authorities defended the ban, stating that it aimed to develop a home-grown Ukrainian distribution industry and to give Ukrainian distributors "muscle" in negotiating their own deals to buy foreign films. Russian distributors control around 90% of foreign films screened in Ukraine and tend to supply Russian-language dubbed or subtitled copies that are part of wider packages distributed throughout Russia and the former Soviet territories. Andriy Khalpakhchi, director the Ukrainian Cinema Foundation, claims "Some European sellers at Berlin's film market are reporting that Russian buyers are already threatening not to buy films if they sell directly to Ukraine without using Russian distribution channels." Despite earlier fears that there would be problems due to the introduction of compulsory Ukrainian dubbing of films, the number of visitors to Ukrainian cinemas soared by 40% in Q1 of the year 2009 compared to the same period of the previous year.

Several Russian TV channels have not been allowed to broadcast in Ukraine since November 1, 2008, according to Ukraine's National Council on Television and Radio Broadcasting mainly because of the advertising aired by the channels. The Ukrainian distributors of television channels were ordered to bring the broadcasts in line with Ukrainian laws. Channel One and Ren TV have since been granted temporary permission to broadcast, while a separate version of RTR Planeta was started specially for Ukrainian TV viewers in October 2009.

On 13 May 2010, Russian Foreign Minister Sergei Lavrov claimed that in Ukraine "the discriminatory, motivated, ideology-tinged and anti-Russian decisions that were being made when Yuschenko was President have been lifted".

On 23 May 2017, Ukrainian parliament approved the law proposed in November 2016 that demands national, regional, satellite, and multi-channel TV and radio networks to broadcast at least 75% of their content (summarized on weekly basis separately in time intervals 7am6pm and 6pm10pm) in Ukrainian starting from 13 October 2017. 50% is required from local networks, and 75% of news programs is required in Ukrainian for all networks. Films and broadcasts which are not products of these networks and produced after 1991 must be broadcast exclusively in Ukrainian. Reasonable exceptions are provided for inclusion of non-Ukrainian language into otherwise Ukrainian-language broadcasts. The National Security and Defense Council of Ukraine may permit exceptions to this law for broadcasts which serve elimination of threats to national security. At the time the only two national Ukrainian TV channels who did not already broadcast 75% of their content in Ukrainian were "Inter" and "Ukraine".  Also because of this May 2017 approved law, since 8 November 2018 Ukrainian radio stations must broadcast no less than 35% of songs in Ukrainian or if it plays 60% of its songs in the official languages of the European Union then 25%.

Politics
In two presidential elections, in 1994 and 2004, the role of languages in Ukraine was an important election issue. In 1994 the main opposition candidate, Leonid Kuchma, in an attempt to widen his political appeal, expressed his support for the idea of Russian becoming the second state language, as well as promising to improve his knowledge of the Ukrainian language. In addition to the stagnating economy, the language issue likely contributed to Kuchma's victory in the election; but while his knowledge of Ukrainian noticeably improved, Kuchma did not follow through on his pledge to make Russian a state language during the 10 years of his presidency.
 

In 2004 an election promise by Viktor Yanukovych (leader of the Party of Regions) to adopt Russian as the second official language might also have increased the turnout of his base, but it was rebutted during the campaign by his opponent (Viktor Yushchenko), who pointed out that Yanukovych could have already taken steps towards this change while he was a Prime Minister of Ukraine if this had really been his priority. During his campaign Yushchenko emphasized that his being painted as a proponent of the closure of Russian schools frequently made by his opponents is entirely baseless and stated his view that the issue of school language, as well as the churches, should be left to local communities. Nevertheless, during Yuchshenko's presidency the transfer of educational institutions from Russian to Ukrainian continued.

In the 2006 parliamentary election the status of the Russian language in Ukraine was brought up again by the opposition parties. The leading opposition party, Party of Regions, promised to introduce two official languages, Russian and Ukrainian, on the national and regional levels. On the national level such changes require modifying Article 10 of the Constitution of Ukraine, which the party hopes to achieve. Before the election in Kharkiv, and following the election in the other south-eastern regions such as Donetsk, Dnipropetrovsk, Luhansk, Mykolaiv, and the Crimea, the newly elected local councils, won by the Party of Regions (and minor supporting parties), declared Russian as a regional language, citing the European Charter for Regional or Minority Languages, ratified by Ukraine in 2003. In Dnipropetrovsk, the court has found the order of the city council on introducing Russian as a regional language unlawful, but the legal battle on the local status of the Russian language remains to be resolved.

In the wake of the 2006 Parliamentary crisis in Ukraine that fractured the governing coalition and returned Yanukovych to the Prime Ministership, the "Universal of National Unity" signed by President Yushchenko as well as the leaders of several of the most influential political parties declared that Ukrainian would remain the official state language in Ukraine. However, within a week after signing the Universal, Yanukovych, then approved as Prime Minister of Ukraine, stated at a press conference in Sochi (Russia) that the implementation of Russian as a second state language remains the goal of his party even though he does not see it achieved in the immediate future because such a change, which would require amending the Constitution, would not collect the required majority (⅔) in the Parliament of Ukraine given the current political situation.

During the electoral campaign for the 2010 Ukrainian presidential election Yanukovych at first stated that if he would be elected President he then will do everything in order to make Russian the second state language in Ukraine, but in an interview with Kommersant later during the campaign he stated that the status of Russian in Ukraine "is too politicized" and said that if elected president in 2010 he would "have a real opportunity to adopt a law on languages, which implements the requirements of the European Charter of regional languages". He implied this law would need 226 votes in the Ukrainian parliament (50% of the votes instead of the 75% of the votes needed to change the constitution of Ukraine). After his early 2010 election as President Yanukovych stated (on March 9, 2010) "Ukraine will continue to promote the Ukrainian language as its only state language".

Law
According to the laws on civil and administrative procedure enacted in Ukraine in 2005, all legal and court proceedings in Ukraine are to be conducted in Ukrainian. This does not restrict, however, the usage of other languages, as the law guarantees interpretation services for any language desired by a citizen, defendant or witness.

Historical and political calendar
President Petro Poroshenko claimed to be carrying out the "Ukrainianization of the historical and political calendar - the replacement of the Soviet-Russian imposed upon us." This has led to the moving of military holidays to new dates and the creation of the Defenders of Ukraine Day.

The 2017 abolition of May 2 as public holiday (as it was in the Soviet era) and instead (since 2017) making Western Christianity's Christmas, celebrated 25 December, a new Ukrainian public holiday was also described as moving away from  "Moscow's calendar and Russian imperial standards" (by Oleksandr Turchynov, the Secretary of the National Security and Defense Council of Ukraine in 2017). (May 1's International Workers' Day remained a Ukrainian public holiday, although it was renamed (also in 2017) from "Day of International Solidarity of Workers" to "Labor Day".)

See also
 Belarusization
 Language policy in Ukraine
 Reversal of Ukrainization policies in Soviet Ukraine
 Russian language in Ukraine
 Russians in Ukraine
 Ukrainian nationalism
 Ukrainophilia
 Derussification in Ukraine
 Volhynian Genocide
 Chronology of Ukrainian language suppression

References

Further reading
Volodymyr Kubiyovych; Zenon Kuzelia, Енциклопедія українознавства  (Encyclopedia of Ukrainian studies), 3-volumes, Kyiv, 1994,  
 George O. Liber, Soviet nationality policy, urban growth, and identity change in the Ukrainian SSR 1923-1934, Cambridge: CUP, 1992, 
 James E. Mace, Communism and the Dilemmas of National Liberation. National Communism in Soviet Ukraine 1918-1933, Cambridge, Mass.: HURI Harvard, 1983, 
 Terry D. Martin, The Affirmative Action Empire. Nations and Nationalism in the Soviet Union, 1923-1939, Ithaca and London: Cornell University Press, 2001, 
Закон про мови (Law on languages), 1989 (in Ukrainian), English translation.
Constitution of Ukraine.
Ukrainian language - the third official?, Ukrayinska Pravda, November 28, 2005
 
UKRAINE:  Russian Language Toned Down, Inter Press Service, August 11, 2008
 
 Myroslav Shkandrij. The Ukrainian reading public in the 1920s: real, implied, and ideal Canadian Slavonic Papers 58, no.2 (2016)

Social history of Ukraine
Soviet internal politics
Cultural assimilation
Ukrainian nationalism
Ukrainian language
Cultural regions
Slavicization
Ukrainian culture
Ukrainization